HNLMS Friesland (D812) was a destroyer of the . The ship was in service with the Royal Netherlands Navy from 1956 to 1979. The destroyer was named after the Dutch province of Friesland and was the fourteenth ship with this name. In 1979 the ship was taken out of service and later broken up. The ship's radio call sign was "PAJF".

History
HNLMS Friesland was one of eight s and was built at the NDSM in Amsterdam. The keel laying took place on 17 December 1951 and the launching on 21 February 1953. The ship was put into service on 22 March 1956.

In July 1956 Friesland, the destroyer  and the cruiser  visited Leningrad for the first time since 1914. Where they were officially welcomed at the harbor of Kronstadt by the Soviet authorities.

In 1962 during the West New Guinea dispute Friesland thwarted an Indonesian landing on the island of Misool, at that time part of Netherlands New Guinea.

On 29 June 1979 the vessel was decommissioned and later scrapped. She was the only ship of her class not to be sold to the Peruvian Navy

Notes

Friesland-class destroyers
1953 ships
Ships built in Amsterdam
Destroyers of the Cold War